The Platt Building is a 1927 highrise at 834 South Broadway in Downtown Los Angeles. The Gothic Revival design was by architects Walker & Eisen. The firm also designed The Beverly Wilshire Hotel on Wilshire Boulevard in Beverly Hills.

The building was originally the headquarters of the Platt Music Corporation.

The Platt Building is one of the Anjac Fashion Buildings, and the National Register of Historic Places nomination form for the Broadway Theater and Commercial District uses this name to designate the building. Anjac is a portmanteau of the names Annette and Jack Needleman, real estate owners who in 1964 began buying properties in the Fashion District and surrounding area.

References

External links
 

1920s architecture in the United States
1927 establishments in California
Buildings and structures in Downtown Los Angeles
Commercial buildings in Los Angeles
Office buildings completed in 1927
Skyscraper office buildings in Los Angeles